The Wabash Railroad's class P-1 comprised seven 4-6-4 steam locomotives rebuilt from 5 Class K-5 2-8-2's numbered 2600-2604 and 2 Class K-4 2-8-2's numbered 2743 and 2744 .

The first five were constructed in 1943 and 1944 using the boilers from their unsuccessful K-5 class three-cylinder 2-8-2 locomotives that had been built by the American Locomotive Company's Schenectady works in 1925.

Two additional locomotives were converted in 1946 and 1947 using a pair of K-4 class 2-8-2s as donors at the Decatur Shops in Illinois .

The engines were semi-streamlined with long "elephant ear" smoke deflectors, and painted blue with a broad white stripe trimmed in red down the side of the locomotive and on the steam dome; the tenders received a similar paint job. The locomotives’ number was painted on the tender, and in later years the flag logo was applied to the deflectors. They ran until 1956.

Models

Scale models exist of the P-1s, most notably in O gauge by MTH and Lionel. An HO (1:87) version was available in brass from Hallmark Models.

References

Notes

Bibliography
 
 
 

4-6-4 locomotives
P-1
Steam locomotives of the United States
Railway locomotives introduced in 1943
Scrapped locomotives